Bared to You is a 2012 New York Times bestselling erotic new adult romance novel by veteran writer Sylvia Day, focusing on the complicated relationship between two twentysomething protagonists with equally abusive pasts. The novel was initially self-published on April 3, 2012 by Day, with Berkley Books re-publishing the book on June 12, 2012 with an initial print run of 500,000 copies. Day has stated that Bared to You will be the first novel in her Crossfire series, with the follow-up novel, Reflected in You, published in October 2012. The Crossfire series sold five million English-language copies in 2012 and international rights were licensed in thirty-eight territories as of January 2013.

Bared to You was declared Penguin UK's "fastest selling paperback for a decade" and Penguin Group (USA) reports that Bared to You is Berkley's biggest breakout book of 2012. In December 2012, Amazon.com announced that Bared to You was #4 on the e-tailer's list of top 10 best-selling books of 2012 overall (print and Kindle combined), Apple announced that Bared to You was #5 on iTunes' Top Ten Books of the Year, and Nielsen announced that Bared to You was #7 on BookScan's Top 10 Print Book Sales of 2012 – Adult Fiction. Bared to You spent forty-five weeks on The New York Times trade paperback bestseller list and sixty-seven weeks on the USA Today bestseller list.

Synopsis
Although Eva Tramell, a 24-year-old survivor of childhood sexual abuse, finds it difficult at times to overcome her past, she is drawn to young billionaire Gideon Cross, another childhood sexual abuse survivor. They must find a way to heal each other and establish a healthy romantic relationship.

Reception
Bared to You was selected by Amazon's editors as the #1 Best Book of the Year So Far in Romance, covering the period between January through to July of the year 2012. It remained on Amazon's Best Books of the Year in Romance end-of-year list covering the entire year of 2012. Bared to You was nominated for the 2012 Goodreads Choice Award for Best Romance and Day herself was nominated for Best Goodreads Author.

RT Book Reviews praised the book's characters, stating, "Day creates two multidimensional characters in heroine Eva and hero Gideon, whose successful and attractive exteriors hide traumatized pasts. Especially notable is Day's portrayal of Eva. The heroine is a rape survivor who is able to independently overcome her abuse and find a full and fulfilling sex life.", while a reviewer for The Guardian criticized the book as "banal". The Independent also criticized some of the book's elements as "easy to mock" but praised Day's writing and noted that the relationship was "at least healthier than the dysfunctional wreck of Fifty Shades".

Media
In April 2013, HeroesAndHeartbreakers.com broke the news that Day's Crossfire series had been optioned for television adaptation. Lions Gate Entertainment secured the rights. Kevin Beggs, President of the Lionsgate Television Group, confirmed the acquisition on August 5, 2013 in a press release. Lionsgate TV Executive Vice President Chris Selak, who will oversee development for the studio, said, "The Crossfire series is an incredible property and it is a thrill to bring it to Lionsgate. Sylvia has created an enduring, sexy and edgy story, and we're looking forward to working with her to create a show that both excites and connects with audiences as her books have done." Although, Lionsgate optioned the rights to the Crossfire saga in 2013 and renewed the option twice, in 2016 and after three years of development, Day declined to option again. In 2019, the option was acquired by a different studio for development as a television series. The project is in active development, with Day executive producing.

Erotic Trend in 2012
Some news sources have commented on the similar marketing strategies used with the Crossfire series and Fifty Shades trilogy, with The Daily Beast remarking that Berkley marketed the book as a "Fifty Shades clone, down to its gray book jacket featuring a pair of cuff links and the tagline: “He possessed me and obsessed me." Both series are published by Penguin Random House.

The global success of both Crossfire and Fifty Shades spurred a wave of erotic releases in 2012, with many imitating the two series' content and packaging, but, as The Guardian noted, "other houses' efforts made little impact."

References

External links
 .

2012 American novels
American romance novels
American erotic novels
Novels set in New York City
Berkley Books books
Contemporary romance novels